The red-headed parrotfinch (Erythrura cyaneovirens) is a common species of estrildid finch found in the Samoan Islands. It has an estimated global extent of occurrence of 20,000 to 50,000 km2.

It is found in subtropical/tropical lowland moist forest.

References

External links
Species factsheet - BirdLife International

Erythrura
Birds of Samoa
Birds described in 1848
Taxa named by Titian Peale